Lioberus is a genus of mussels in the family Mytilidae.

Selected species
 Lioberus castaneus (Say, 1822) — Say's chestnut mussel

References

Mytilidae
Bivalve genera